Saint-Sulpice-de-Mareuil (literally Saint-Sulpice of Mareuil; Limousin: Sent Soplesí de Maruelh) is a former commune in the Dordogne department in Nouvelle-Aquitaine in southwestern France. On 1 January 2017, it was merged into the new commune Mareuil en Périgord.

Geography
The Lizonne forms the commune's northern border.

Population

See also
Communes of the Dordogne department

References

Former communes of Dordogne